A Grande Vitória (English: The Great Victory) is a 2014 Brazilian sports drama film based on the book Aprendiz de Samurai by Max Trombini. This film adaptation was directed by Stefano Capuzzi Lapietra. Starring Caio Castro and Sabrina Sato, it tells the true story of the judoka Max Trombini, who had a humble and troubled childhood. Through judo, the boy becomes involved with martial arts principles and thus learn to settle down emotionally and starts building a career, becoming one of the greatest judo coaches in Brazil.

Plot
Max Trombini had a humble and troubled childhood. Abandoned by the father when still young, he was raised by his mother and grandfather, who died when he was 11 years old. Disgusted, he began to get in all sorts of trouble in his hometown, Ubatuba, and then in Bastos, where he lived. It was through learning martial arts, particularly judo, through which he managed to level out emotionally and build a career.

Cast
 Caio Castro as Max Trombini
Felipe Falanga as young Max
 Sabrina Sato as Alice
 Suzana Pires as Tereza Maximiano
 Tato Gabus Mendes as Sensei Josino
 Domingos Montagner as César Trombini
 Moacyr Franco as Benedito Maximiano
 Ratinho (Carlos Massa) as Carlão
 Felipe Folgosi como Flávio
 Rosi Campos como Principal Célia
 Tuna Dwek como Maria José
 Max Trombini como as Mr. Ariovaldo, Max's teacher
 Ênio Gonçalves
 Ken Kaneco

Production
In order to play the judoka Max Trombini, Caio used his own experience in the sport. He practiced judo as a child, but he didn't get very far in terms of graduation. Some scenes of the film were filmed at the traditional academy Vila Sônia, in São Paulo. It was there that the Olympic champion Aurélio Miguel began practicing the sport and where Caio made an immersion with renowned technicians as the masters Massao and Luiz Shinohara, current men's team coach.

Trombini himself plays Ariovaldo, Max's P.E. teacher at school and one of his judo trainers.

References

External links 
 

2014 films
2010s sports drama films
Brazilian biographical drama films
2014 biographical drama films
Martial arts films
Films shot in São Paulo
Brazilian sports drama films
2014 directorial debut films
2014 drama films